The 1968 Railway Cup Hurling Championship was the 42nd staging of the Railway Cup since its establishment by the Gaelic Athletic Association in 1927. The cup began on 25 February 1968 ended on 17 March 1968.

Leinster were the defending champions.

On 17 March 1968, Munster won the cup following a 0-14 to 0-10 defeat of Leinster in the final. This was their 29th Railway Cup title and their first since 1966.

Munster's Justin McCarthy was the top scorer with 2-06.

Results

Semi-finals

Final

Scoring statistics

Top scorers overall

Top scorers in a single game

Bibliography

 Donegan, Des, The Complete Handbook of Gaelic Games (DBA Publications Limited, 2005).

References

Railway Cup Hurling Championship
1968 in hurling